The rough sculpin (Cottus asperrimus) is a species of fish in the family Cottidae. It is endemic to California, the United States. Its habitat includes spring-fed tributaries of the Pit River system in northeastern Shasta County, California, including the Fall River and its major tributary, the Tule River. It grows to  total length.

References

Cottus (fish)
Freshwater fish of the United States
Fish of the Western United States
Endemic fauna of California
Taxa named by Cloudsley Louis Rutter
Fish described in 1908
Taxonomy articles created by Polbot